Marmaracık is a town in Tekirdağ Province of Turkey. It is planned that Marmaracık will be the capital of Ergene district in 2014.

Geography 

Marmaracık is a town in Çorlu district of Tekirdağ Province. It is situated in Rumeli (Thrace) section of Turkey. The population of Marmaracık is 6182 as of 2011.

History 
The population of the town is composed of Türkmen people which were settled in Dobrudja of Romania by the Ottoman Empire government during the early years of the empire. In 1920s, most of these people returned to Turkey and a part of them were settled in Marmaracık. In 1999 the settlement was declared a seat of township.

Economy 

Wheat and sunflower are the two main agricultural crops. Marmaracık is situated in a flourishing industrial area and there are industrial facilities and depo's around.

References

Populated places in Tekirdağ Province
Towns in Turkey
Çorlu District